Blacksheep TV (பிளாக்ஷீப்) is an Indian Tamil-language general entertainment channel owned by RJ Vigneshkanth on 15 January 2023 replacing Chithiram TV. It telecasts Game shows, Talk shows, Tamil Films and comedy shows. It is also available through digital entertainment platform BS Value.

History
It was launched on 15 January 2023 which started on the Tamil Pongal Festival. The channel is owned by RJ Vigneshkanth, is a homegrown regional Over-the-top media service brand 'BlackSheep' launched 'Blacksheep TV' satellite channel after success with multiple YouTube  channels, its own dedicated platforms and several original shows and productions.

The channel was announced in October 2022, with the Tamil comedy icon Vadivelu as its ambassador, originally scheduled to be Test launched on 6 November but delayed to 12 December and official launched on 15 January 2023 and was rebranded from Chithiram TV. The slogan is 'எல்லாருக்கும் நல்லாருக்கும்!!; Ellarukkum Nallarukkum!!' (Good for everyone).

References

External links
 

Tamil-language television stations
Tamil-language television channels
Television stations in Chennai
Television channels and stations established in 2023
2023 establishments in Tamil Nadu